Badlands Unlimited was a New York-based independent publisher founded by the artist Paul Chan in 2010. The press published texts by and with other artists in the form of paperbacks, ebooks, digital group exhibitions, a stone book, and other various media. The press also consulted on projects related to digital publishing for art institutions. As of late 2019, Badlands Unlimited has "closed for good". Badlands books have been featured and reviewed in the New York Times, New York Review of Books, Bookforum, Publishers Weekly, and Vogue, among many other publications.

History
Paul Chan founded Badlands Unlimited in 2010 with the goal of "creating books in an expanded field." The company's flagship publications, The Essential and Incomplete Sade for Sade's Sake and Phaedrus Pron were authored by Chan himself and released as both paperback and e-books. Badlands consisted of fellow artists Ian Cheng, Micaela Durand, Parker Bruce, and Ambika Subra. With the publication of a book of poetry by choreographer and filmmaker Yvonne Rainer, Badlands began its secondary mission of publishing "things no one knew existed."

Badlands continued its departure from traditional paperback books with Mans in the Mirror (2011), a project that Badlands describes as a "first of its kind" 3D e-book. The staff of Badlands authored Mirror over the course of a single day while under the influence of mescaline. Existing solely in e-book format, publication would reinforce Badlands’ emphasis on digital publishing.

In 2012 Badlands published How to Download A Boyfriend, the "first-ever group show in the form of an e-book for the iPad." The show featured contributions from over 50 different artists and included interactive multiple-choice questions for the reader.

Later in 2012 Badlands Unlimited became the NY Art Book Fair's first primarily digital publisher. The press premiered Paul Chan's short story Holiday as both a digital e-book and on a sandstone tablet with its own ISBN.

Badlands further diversified the content of its publications with the release of AD BOOK by the art collective BFFA3AE in 2013. AD BOOK is a book consisting solely of advertisements by artists and institutions.

In keeping with its secondary mission to publish work revealing heretofore unknown sides of public figures, Badlands published a collection of essays On Democracy by Saddam Hussein (2012), 22 years' worth of never before collected diagrams and notes by curator and Serpentine Gallery co-director Hans Ulrich Obrist in Think Like Clouds (2014), and never before published 1964 interviews with Marcel Duchamp by Calvin Tomkins in Marcel Duchamp: The Afternoon Interviews (2013). Badlands’ most recent publication adhering to this pursuit is The Best Most Useless Dress (2014) by poet and New York Times critic Claudia La Rocco.

Selected books and publications 
2020. Word Book. Ludwig Wittgenstein and Désirée Weber. Trans. Bettina Funke, Catherine Schelbert, and Nickolas Calabrese. Hardcover. 
 2019. Odysseus and The Bathers. Paul Chan. Hardcover. 
2018. Whitewalling: Art, Race & Protest in 3 Acts. Aruna D'Souza. Paperback. 
2018. Craig Owens: Portrait of a Young Critic. Craig Owens, Lyn Blumnenthal, Kate Horsfield, and Lynne Tillman. Paperback. 
2017. Into Words: The Selected Writings of Carroll Dunham. Carroll Dunham. Paperback. 
2016. New Lovers 9: Fantasian. Larissa Pham. Paperback. 
2016. New Lovers 8: One Valencia Lane. Bettina Davis. Paperback. 
2016. New Lovers 7: Kuntalini. Tamara Faith Berger. Paperback. 
2015. New Lovers 6: Burning Blue. Cara Benedetto. Paperback. 
2015. New Lovers 5: I Would Do Anything For Love. Al Bedell. Paperback. 
2015. New Lovers 4: My Wet Hot Drone Summer. Lex Brown. Paperback. 
2015. New Lovers 3: God, I Don't Even Know Your Name. Andrea McGinty. Paperback. 
2015. New Lovers 2: We Love Lucy. Lilith Wes. Paperback. 
2015. New Lovers 1: How to Train Your Virgin. Wednesday Black. Paperback. 
2015. Hippias Minor or The Art Of Cunning: A New Translation. Plato, Paul Chan, and Richard Fletcher. Trans. Sarah Ruden. Paperback. 
2014. New New Testament. Paul Chan. Hardcover. 
2014. The Best Most Useless Dress. Claudia La Rocco. Paperback, e-book. 
 2014. Think Like Clouds. Hans Ulrich Obrist. Paperback, e-book.  
 2014. Paul Chan: Selected Writings 2000–2014. Chan, Paul, George Baker, Eric Banks, Isabel Friedli, and Martina Venanzoni. Paperback, e-book. 
 2013. AD BOOK. BFFA3AE. E-book.
 2013. Marcel Duchamp: The Afternoon Interviews Calvin Tomkins. Paperback, e-book. 
 2013. Fires of Siberia. Tréy Sager. E-book.
 2012. On Democracy. Hussein, Saddam, Paul Chan, Jeff Severns Guntzel, Negar Azimi, and Nickolas Calabrese.  Paperback, e-book. 
 2012. HELL_TREE. Petra Cortright. E-book. 
 2012. How to Download a Boyfriend. E-book.
 2011. What is? A series of unique hand-made zines, e-book series.
 2011. Mans in the Mirrors (in 3D). 3-D e-book. 
 2011. Poems. poems by Yvonne Rainer. Print, e-book. 
2010. Phaedrus Pron. Paul Chan. Paperback. 
2010. The Essential and Incomplete Sade for Sade's Sake. Paul Chan. Paperback.

Notable authors 
 Etel Adnan
 Cory Arcangel
 Gregg Bordowitz
 Bernadette Corporation
  Paul Chan
 Petra Cortright
 Aruna D’Souza
 Marcel Duchamp
 Carroll Dunham
 Hans Ulrich Obrist
  Craig Owens
 Dread Scott
 Cauleen Smith
 Martine Syms
 Yvonne Rainer
 Claudia La Rocco
 Rachel Rose
 Trey Sager
 Lynne Tillman
 Calvin Tomkins

Controversy 
Badlands Unlimited's participation in the 2010 NY Art Book Fair as the event's first publisher primarily focused on e-book publication ignited debate over whether the rise of e-books would mean the destruction of traditional paperback publications.

Apple temporarily removed How to Download a Boyfriend from its e-book store citing concerns over nudity in the book. The item has since been made available for purchase again.

References

External links 

 
 
 
 
 
 
 
 
 
 "Books in an Expanded Field: The Story of Badlands Unlimited." Matthew Erickson. LA Review of Books. Badlands Unlimited. February 8, 2013.

Publishing companies established in 2010